American Experience, originally titled The American Experience, is an American television program and a PBS documentary series created by Peter McGhee. The series airs documentaries about significant historical events or figures in United States history. The show is produced primarily by WGBH-TV, a television station and PBS affiliate located in Boston, Massachusetts. WGBH-TV creates non-commercial educational programs and distributes them on public television stations throughout the United States. However, other PBS affiliate stations, such as WNET in New York City, have co-produced episodes for the television series. Since the program's debut on October 4, 1988, American Experience has broadcast 367 new episodes and has been a recipient of over 265 broadcast and web awards.

The program's thirty-fifth season premiered on January 3, 2023.

Series overview

Episodes

Season 1 (1988–89)

Season 2 (1989–90)

Season 3 (1990–91)

Season 4 (1991–92)

Season 5 (1992–93)

Season 6 (1993–94)

Season 7 (1994–95)

Season 8 (1995–96)

Season 9 (1996–97)

Season 10 (1997–98)

Season 11 (1998–99)

Season 12 (1999–2000)

Season 13 (2000–01)

Season 14 (2001–02)

Season 15 (2002–03)

Season 16 (2003–04)

Season 17 (2004–05)

Season 18 (2005–06)

Season 19 (2006–07)

Season 20 (2008)

Season 21 (2009)

Season 22 (2009–10)

Season 23 (2010–11)

Season 24 (2012)

Season 25 (2013)

Season 26 (2014)

Season 27 (2015)

Season 28 (2016)

Season 29 (2017)

Season 30 (2018)

Season 31 (2019)

Season 32 (2020)

Season 33 (2021)

Season 34 (2022)

Season 35 (2023)

Upcoming episodes

See also

Notes

References

External links 
  official website

 

Lists of American non-fiction television series episodes